Nosson (Ashkenazic form of Nathan) may refer to:

 Rabbi Nosson Scherman, an American Haredi Orthodox rabbi
 Rabbi Nosson Tzvi Finkel (Mir) (1943–2011), the Rosh Yeshiva of the Mir Yeshiva in Beis Yisroel, Jerusalem
 Rabbi Nosson Tzvi Finkel (Slabodka) (1849–1927), leader of Orthodox Judaism in Eastern Europe
 Rabbi Shlomo Nosson Kotler (1856–1920), Orthodox rabbi, Rosh yeshiva and Talmudic scholar
 Rabbi Nosson Slifkin, known as the "Zoo Rabbi" (born 1975)
 Rabbi Noson Sternhartz (1780–1844), main student of Rebbe Nachman of Breslov

See also
 Avos de-Rebbi Nosson

Ralated surnames
 Nathanson (Natanson, Nathansohn)

Hebrew masculine given names